Caine is a surname of several different origins. In many cases it is a variation of the surname Cain.

When the surname is of French origin, in some cases it is derived from a derogatory nickname for someone with a bad temper - from the French caigne "bitch".

Notable people with the surname include:

 Hall Caine, British novelist and playwright
 Hugh Le Caine, Canadian physicist, composer and instrument builder
 Jeffrey Caine, British writer and actor
 Jonathan Caine, Baron Caine, political aide
 Marti Caine, (1945–1995), English comedian and singer
 Martin Caine, American college football head coach
 Michael Caine, British film actor
 Natalie Caine (1909–2008), also known by her married name Natalie James, English oboist
 Rachel Caine (1962-2020), pen name of Roxanne Longstreet Conrad, an American writer of science fiction stories
 Rebecca Caine, Canadian opera singer
 Shakira Caine, Guyanese model, married to Michael Caine
 Stanley Caine (1936–2013), English actor
 Trudi Le Caine (née Janowski), an arts patron, wife of Hugh Le Caine
 William Caine, Governor-general of Hong Kong 1854–1859
 William Sproston Caine (1842–1903), British politician and Temperance advocate

In fiction
 Kwai Chang Caine, main character on the television series Kung Fu

 Alastair Caine, a demon on the television series Charmed

 Virgil Caine, protagonist of The Band song The Night They Drove Old Dixie Down

See also
 Cain (disambiguation)
 Kaine (surname)

References